Jeffrey J. Finger (born December 18, 1979) is an American former professional ice hockey defenseman who played in the National Hockey League with the Colorado Avalanche and the Toronto Maple Leafs.

Playing career
Finger was drafted 240th overall (8th round) by the Colorado Avalanche in the 1999 NHL Entry Draft. While playing junior hockey with the Green Bay Gamblers (USHL) he was selected the league's defenseman of the Year for the 1999–2000 season. In the 2000–2001 season he was named St.Cloud's (WCHA) Outstanding Freshman Hockey Player. Finger resides in Calumet, Michigan during the summer and spends much of his time working out and fishing the streams near Lake Superior.

Finger played in the final 22 games of the 2006–07 season with the Avalanche. He made his NHL debut on February 20, 2007 against the Calgary Flames and recorded his first NHL point when he assisted on a Paul Stastny goal against the Columbus Blue Jackets on February 27. On March 1 he scored his first NHL goal against Nikolai Khabibulin of the Chicago Blackhawks in a 6-1 rout. Finger finished the season with one goal and four assists with 11 penalty minutes and a +10 plus/minus that tied for second on the team, trailing only team leader Ken Klee with a +18.

On May 23, 2007, the Avalanche re-signed Finger to a one-year contract for the 2007–08 season. In his first full season with the Avalanche, Finger emerged as a serviceable defenseman and played in a career-high 72 games, scoring 8 goals.

On July 1, 2008, the Toronto Maple Leafs signed Finger to a four-year deal worth $3.5 million per season. After two seasons with the Maple Leafs, Finger was placed on waivers on October 12, 2010 and sent down to the Leafs' AHL affiliate the following day.

Career statistics

Awards and honors

References

External links

1979 births
Living people
Albany River Rats players
American men's ice hockey defensemen
Colorado Avalanche draft picks
Colorado Avalanche players
Green Bay Gamblers players
Hershey Bears players
Ice hockey players from Michigan
Lowell Lock Monsters players
People from Houghton, Michigan
Reading Royals players
St. Cloud State Huskies men's ice hockey players
Toronto Maple Leafs players
Toronto Marlies players